Wiz may refer to:

Arts and entertainment
Wizard (MUD), or wiz, a developer or administrator of Multi-User Dungeon game
"Wiz" Zumwalt, the hero of a series of novels by Rick Cook
Wiz (KonoSuba), a character in the light novel series KonoSuba
Wiz, a character in the Wiz 'n' Liz video game
Wiz, a character in the Eternally Confused and Eager for Love Netflix series
Wiz, a character in the D.N.Angel manga series

People 
W.I.Z., Andrew Whiston (born 1964), an English director of films and music videos
Marko Wiz, a 17th century politician in Slovenia 
Wiz, stage name of Darren Brown (musician) (1962–2006)
Wiz, American rapper, member of Bravehearts
Wiz Khalifa, Cameron Jibril Thomaz (born 1987), American singer

Technology 
WiZ, a compression program for Windows
GP2X Wiz, an open-source handheld video game console

Company/Organization 
Wiz (company)
Washington Wizards

See also 
The Wiz (disambiguation)
Wizard (disambiguation)
WHIZ (disambiguation) (for WHIZ, Whiz and Whizz)
Wizz (disambiguation)
Kansas City Wiz, now Sporting Kansas City